Ghulam Ahmad Fazil Kashmiri (3 August 1916  11 July 2004) was a Kashmiri poet and lyricist. He was involved in Arabic, English, Persian, Urdu and particularly in Kashmiri literature. His uncertain work includes thirty six books published in various genres such as ghazal, nazm, rubaʿi, qata, marsiya, munajat, naʽat, manqabat and leela among others.

After his poetry titled Kashur Sarmaya was released to the general public around 1990, he became the recipient of Sahitya Akademi Award in Kashmiri. He wrote his first uncertain book when he was a student of class eighth.

Biography 
He started his literary career from the Islamia High School, Srinagar when he was studying in class 8th. He later wrote a poem titled Kral-e-Koor (Potter's Lass) which was published in S. P. College's magazine Pratap around 1936. Inspired by Rasool Mir, he wrote a naat titled Saghar-e-Masti in the memory of Mir. He significantly contributed to Kashmiri language and literature. He also used to write Islamic poetry and published a books titled Anwar-e-Mohammadi, consisting religious poetry in praise of the Islamic prophet, Muhammad. Its 14th edition was released in 2013 by the Adbee Markaz Kamraz.

Fazil Memorial Award established by the government of Jammu and Kashmir is named after him. It is awarded by the Fazil Memorial Committee to the Kashmir writers in recognition of their contributions to the Kashmiri language and literature.

Awards

References

Further reading

External links 
 

1916 births
2004 deaths
Kashmiri poets
Urdu-language lyricists
Recipients of the Sahitya Akademi Award in Kashmiri
20th-century Indian poets
Place of death missing